Mohamed Soliman Zaki (born 1 January 1979) commonly known as Mohamed Homos or simply Homos, is an Egyptian former professional footballer. 
A midfielder, he played for Ismaily for most of his career.

Career
With the Egyptian national team played in the 2009 FIFA Confederations Cup, he scored his first ever and only international goal from a header in Egypt's second game of the group stage against Italy, giving the reigning African champions a 1–0 win over the reigning world champions. After the match, he was named Man of the Match by the FIFA Technical Study Group (TSG).

Honours
Isamily
 Egypt Cup (2): 1997, 2000

International career

International goals

Managerial statistics

References

External links

Homos at Footballdatabase

1979 births
Living people
Egyptian footballers
Egypt international footballers
2009 FIFA Confederations Cup players
People from Ismailia Governorate
Ismaily SC players
Wadi Degla SC players
Association football midfielders
Egyptian Premier League players
Egyptian expatriate sportspeople in Oman